Joseph-Marius Avy (Marseille, September 21, 1871 - Paris, December 29, 1939) was a French painter.

He painted landscapes, genre scenes, especially on the elegant Parisian environment, and wall decorations. He was also a skilled illustrator and an accomplished pastelist.

Biography 
Joseph Marius Jean Avy, known as Marius Avy, was born in Marseille into a wealthy family. His father was a businessman. After his first studies he manifested the  desire to undertake the path of art, following his own inclinations. He was therefore sent to Paris, where he was a pupil of Léon Bonnat and Albert Maignan.

From 1900 until 1933 he regularly exhibited at the "Salon des artistes français" and, from 1934 to 1939, the year of his death, at the "Salon de la Société nationale des beaux-arts".

In 1900 he won the Marie Bashkirtseff Prize, in 1903 he was awarded the second class medal and, in 1937, the "Diplôme d'honneur". He was awarded the title of Knight of the Legion d'honneur and, ten years later, was promoted to Commander. During the First World War he was decorated with the Cross of War.

In 1909 Avy married Germaine Besnard, daughter of the painter Albert Besnard, having as best man at the wedding the artist Henry Lerolle.On this occasion he assisted his father-in-law in arranging the canvases that decorated the dome of the Petit Palais. Albert Besnard portrayed him in uniform in a 1916 pastel.

Joseph Marius Avy often painted Italian landscapes. Some of his compositions of worldly life, such as the Bal en blanc, painted with a particular harmony of very contrasting colors, can be considered apart for their distinct dynamism. His decorations include the wedding hall of the Rotterdam Town Hall.

After the death of his wife Germaine, Joseph Avy married Clotilde Pregniard on May 12, '39 at the age of 67, but in December of the same year he died at his home in Paris on rue Boissonade.

Works 

 Joseph-Marius Avy, Uranie, 1928, Boulogne-Billancourt, musée des Années Trente
 Joseph-Marius Avy, Bal Blanc, 1903, Paris, Petit Palais

Gallery 

 The ball

 Genre Scenes

References

Bibliography 

 
 Edouard-Joseph, Dictionnaire biographique des Artistes Contemporains, 1910-1930, Libreria Gründ, Parigi, 1934
 
 K. E. Schmidt: Avy, Joseph Marius Jean. In: Ulrich Thieme, Felix Becker (Hrsg.): Allgemeines Lexikon der Bildenden Künstler von der Antike bis zur Gegenwart. Begründet von Ulrich Thieme und Felix Becker. Band 2: Antonio da Monza–Bassan. Wilhelm Engelmann, Lipsia, 1908. S. 285 (Textarchiv – Internet Archive).
 Dati biografici ed Opere di Joseph Marius Jean Avy possono essere reperiti nel "Niederländischen Institut für Kunstgeschichte".

Other projects 

  Wikimedia Commons contiene immagini o altri file su Joseph-Marius Avy

1939 deaths
1871 births
20th-century French painters
19th-century French painters